The following is a list of Montreal Canadiens presidents.

Montreal Canadiens presidents
       
presidents